Senator Davis may refer to:

Members of the United States Senate
Cushman Kellogg Davis (1838–1900), U.S. Senator from Minnesota from 1887 to 1900
David Davis (Supreme Court justice) (1815–1886), U.S. Senator from Illinois from 1877 to 1883
Garrett Davis (1801–1872), U.S. Senator from Kentucky from 1861 to 1872
Henry Gassaway Davis (1823–1916), U.S. Senator from West Virginia from 1871 to 1883
James J. Davis (1873–1947), U.S. Senator from Pennsylvania from 1930 to 1945
Jeff Davis (Arkansas governor) (1862–1913), U.S. Senator from Arkansas from 1907 to 1913
Jefferson Davis (1808–1889), U.S. Senator from Mississippi from 1857 to 1861
John Davis (Massachusetts governor) (1787–1854), U.S. Senator from Massachusetts from 1835 to 1841

United States state senate members
Al Davis (Nebraska politician) (born 1952), Nebraska State Senate
Alexander Davis (politician) (1833–1889), Virginia State Senate
Bart Davis (born 1955), Idaho State Senate
Bettye Davis (1938–2018), Alaska State Senate
Beverly A. Davis (1868–1944), Virginia State Senate
Billy Davis (Arizona politician) (born 1945), Arizona State Senate
Bliss N. Davis (1801–1885), Vermont State Senate
Charles Russell Davis (1849–1930), Minnesota State Senate
Charles W. Davis (politician) (1827–1912), Wisconsin State Senate
Daniel F. Davis (1843–1897), Maine State Senate
David Floyd Davis (1867–1951), New York State Senate
David Davis IV (1906–1978), Illinois State Senate
Debbie McCune Davis (born 1951), Arizona State Senator
Donald G. Davis (born 1971), North Carolina State Senate
Doug E. Davis (born 1977), Mississippi State Senate
Edward M. Davis (1916–2006), California State Senate
Gene Davis (politician) (born 1945), Utah State Senate
George Allen Davis (1857–1920), New York State Senate
George T. Davis (1810–1877), Massachusetts State Senate
Gerald Davis (politician) (born 1936), Maine State Senate
Hardie Davis (born 1968), Georgia State Senate
Helen Davis (1926–2015), Florida State Senate
Horatio N. Davis (1812–1907), Wisconsin State Senate
Isaac Davis (lawyer) (1799–1883), Massachusetts State Senate
J. Mac Davis (born 1952), Wisconsin State Senate
Jackson B. Davis (1918–2016), Louisiana State Senate
Jacob C. Davis (1820–1883), Illinois State Senate
Jeannemarie Devolites Davis (born 1956), Virginia State Senate
Jim Davis (North Carolina politician) (born 1947), North Carolina State Senate
John E. Davis (North Dakota politician) (1913–1990), North Dakota State Senate
John W. Davis (governor) (1826–1907), Rhode Island State Senate
John Warren Davis (judge) (1867–1945), New Jersey State Senate
John Wesley Davis (1799–1859), Indiana State Senate
John Davis (U.S. district court judge) (1761–1847), Massachusetts State Senate
Jonathan D. Davis (1795–1853), Michigan State Senate
Jonathan M. Davis (1871–1943), Kansas State Senate
Joseph R. Davis (1825–1896), Mississippi State Senate
Lloyd E. Davis (1899–1955), Illinois State Senate
Manvel H. Davis (1891–1959), Missouri State Senate
Paul Davis (Maine politician) (born 1947), Maine State Senate
Preston Davis (politician) (1907–1990), Pennsylvania State Senate
Robert William Davis (1932–2009), Michigan State Senate
Romanzo E. Davis (1831–1908), Wisconsin State Senate
Thomas Davis (Rhode Island politician) (1806–1895), Rhode Island State Senate
Tom Davis (South Carolina politician) (born 1960), South Carolina State Senate
Vincent Davis (born 1963), Mississippi State Senate
W. Turner Davis (1901–1988), Florida State Senate
Walter Scott Davis (1866–1943), Washington State Senate
Wendy Davis (politician) (born 1963), Texas State Senate

See also
Senator Davies (disambiguation)